Sai Tau Wai is a village in Wang Chau, Yuen Long District, Hong Kong. It is likely to have been a Punti walled village in the past, although it is not confirmed.

Administration
Sai Tau Wai is a recognized village under the New Territories Small House Policy. It is one of the 37 villages represented within the Ping Shan Rural Committee. For electoral purposes, Sai Tau Wai is part of the Ping Shan North constituency.

See also
 I Shing Temple
 Walled villages of Hong Kong

References

External links

 Delineation of area of existing village Sai Tau Wai (Ping Shan) for election of resident representative (2019 to 2022)
 Antiquities Advisory Board. Historic Building Appraisal. Nos. 4 & 7A, & Lot WCL 132 in DD123, Sai Tau Wai, Wang Chau Pictures
 Antiquities Advisory Board. Historic Building Appraisal. 	Shrine, Sai Tau Wai, Wang Chau Pictures

Villages in Yuen Long District, Hong Kong
Walled villages of Hong Kong
Wang Chau (Yuen Long)